Fujiga-ike is an earthfill dam located in Toyama prefecture in Japan. The dam is used for irrigation. The catchment area of the dam is 4.6 km2. The dam impounds about 10  ha of land when full and can store 615 thousand cubic meters of water. The construction of the dam was started on 1946 and completed in 1950.

References

Dams in Toyama Prefecture
1950 establishments in Japan